Gudum railway station is a small railway station in Balod district, Chhattisgarh. Its code is GUDM. It serves Gudum town. The station consists of two platforms. The platforms are not well sheltered. It lacks many facilities including water and sanitation.

Major trains

Some of the important trains that runs from Gudum are:

 Raipur–Gudum DEMU

References

Railway stations in Balod district
Raipur railway division